Pentti Koskinen (born 24 July 1943) is a Finnish diver. He competed at the 1964 Summer Olympics, the 1968 Summer Olympics and the 1972 Summer Olympics.

References

1943 births
Living people
Finnish male divers
Olympic divers of Finland
Divers at the 1964 Summer Olympics
Divers at the 1968 Summer Olympics
Divers at the 1972 Summer Olympics
Sportspeople from Jyväskylä
20th-century Finnish people